The River's Edge Arts Alliance, also known as the Hudson Area Arts Alliance, was organized in 1990 and incorporated on March 7, 1991.  The River's Edge Arts Alliance is a local, non-profit 501(c)(3) charitable organization which has been dedicated to promoting community arts, arts education and cultural enrichment for the past two decades.  The organization provides arts activities that appeal to a broad range of interests, age groups and backgrounds, the River's Edge Arts Alliance has positively impacted the region's cultural development by offering a wide spectrum of visual and performing art, while bringing people together to enjoy a variety of dynamic arts activities.  The River's Edge Arts Alliance presents musical performances, theater performances, art exhibits as well as offering education classes for children and adults in art, music and theater.  It promotes the growth of the arts in cities and towns in MetroWest Boston as well as Central Massachusetts.

Location 
The River's Edge Arts Alliance Office is located in the Hudson Public Schools Administration Building at 155 Apsley Street in Hudson, Massachusetts.

History 
The concept of the River's Arts Alliance was developed in 1988 when local parents and teachers created an informal organization to increase cultural activities for school children and their families.  The Community Arts Series was created in 1988, followed by the Drama Workshop summer program in 1989. The River's Edge Arts Alliance was formed the following year to manage the Arts Series and Drama Workshop.  Visual art exhibits as well as a newsletter and arts calendar were developed.

Jan Patterson, a founding member of the River's Edge Arts Alliance, was hired as full-time executive director in 1993 through a grant from the Massachusetts Cultural Council.  After school classes, area arts meetings and other programs were added, and the River's Edge Arts Alliance became increasingly known at the regional level.   A program director was hired in 1998 with additional staff added in subsequent years.  The After School Band Lesson Program was developed in 1997 and the Focus on Kids! Series in Marlborough in 1999.  The following year the agency took over management of the Pro Musica Youth Chorus, now called the River's Edge Youth Chorus, and in 2002 the River's Edge Community Band was formed.  Art in the Hall, a series of individual artist exhibits at Hudson Town Hall, was developed in December 2003. The River's Edge Chorale was formed in 2005, followed by the River's Edge Players in 2006.

The River's Edge Arts Alliance fosters appreciation of the arts through education, performance, exhibition, promotion, and by serving as a resource for arts education, cultural groups, and artists in the area.  It serves children, parents, elders, artists, arts organizations, schools, and the population at large as it seeks to inspire deeper interest in all aspects of the arts, foster understanding and appreciation of cultural diversity, and integrate the arts more fully into individual and community life.
	
The organization effectively brings artists into the community while developing the artistic potential of those who live here.  Managed by a small staff, an active board of directors and many other enthusiastic volunteers, the Arts Alliance currently has 150 donors/sponsors and about 350 members from 35 area communities who are individuals, families, artists, organizations and businesses.  There are many other ways that individuals, businesses, organizations, municipalities and foundations support the River's Edge Arts Alliance. Making the arts flourish locally, this support demonstrates the value placed on the creative arts for the many ways they inspire and enrich our communities.
  
The River's Edge Arts Alliance offers a broad array of arts activities in which thousands of adults and children participate, often as families.  The River's Edge Arts Alliance is responsible for creating and sustaining many cultural activities and organizations including: Art in the Hall, Arts After School, Arts in the Park, Community Arts Series, Focus on the Arts, Hudson Band Lesson Program, Hudson Pathways, River's Edge Youth Chorus, River's Edge Chorale, River's Edge Community Band, River's Edge Players, Saturday Morning Discovery Series, Summer Arts, Summer Drama Workshop (now in its 25th year) and many visual arts exhibits.  These quality, yet affordable, events, exhibits and classes are held in Hudson and surrounding towns. In addition to its regular programming in performing arts, visual arts and arts education, the agency has participated in many collaborative and partnership initiatives.  Marlborough residents have participated in Arts Alliance programs since the beginning, and during the past thirteen years, the Arts Alliance has offered an increasing number of programs in the city.

Many community-minded people value creativity and the way it inspires our lives and improves the area's quality of life.  Thanks to the support of area individuals, organizations, businesses, municipalities and foundations that value the arts which so enrich our lives, many community members participate in these free or moderately-priced programs.  The organization believes in integrating the arts into everyday community life, as well as helping arts education thrive. It creates and sustains participant and performance opportunities.  The Arts Alliance collaborates with schools, arts organizations, businesses and artists, all the while bringing diverse people together.  The most critical factor in sustaining area arts programming is the active involvement of the community, people interested in making a difference in their community through the arts.

The Commonwealth Award is the state's highest honor in the arts, humanities and interpretive sciences.  These awards are presented every two years by the Massachusetts Cultural Council to honor individuals and organizations that have made extraordinary contributions to the quality of life, education, and economy in Massachusetts through arts and culture.  This prestigious honor was awarded to the River's Edge Arts Alliance at the State House in 1997.  In 1995 Aerosmith received the Catalyst award, an earlier version of the MCC's Creative Economy Award.  Other winners have included Doris Kearns Goodwin, David McCullough, Henry Hampton, Bradford Washburn, Dr. Stephen Jay Gould, DeCordova Museum & Sculpture Park, Wheelock Family Theater, Greater Boston Youth Symphony Orchestras, North Bennet Street School, Massachusetts College of Art, Stanley Kunitz (10th US Poet Laureate,) Richard Yarde, Yo Yo Ma, Robert Brustein (American Repertory Theatre), Edmund Barry Gaither, Gunther Schuller, City of Pittsfield, Worcester Cultural Coalition and Peabody Essex Museum.

Each year the River's Edge Arts Alliance sponsors dozens of exciting, enriching and entertaining events, exhibits and educational workshops in Marlborough and Hudson, providing the public with numerous opportunities to experience quality arts programs that boost the cultural ambiance of the area.  It brought over thirteen years of bringing to Marlborough the quality cultural programming the Focus on the Arts Series (formerly named Focus on Kids) and Children's Theater Workshop performances.  For ten years, the popular Family Fun Festivals (formerly called The Saturday Morning Discovery Series), a program managed by the River's Edge Arts Alliance for the City of Marlborough, has offered some of the region's top performers presenting free performances on Union Common in the summer and at the Walker Building or Marlborough Senior Center in the winter.

The River's Arts Alliance's 20th anniversary was celebrated on January 16, 2010, with the "Taste of the Arts" Gala at the Hudson Public Library.  The Hudson Selectmen's proclamation was read by Sonny Parente, and Senator Jamie Eldridge and Representative Kate Hogan offered recognition from the State House.  Also on hand were a variety of musicians and visual artists who shared their work with the attendees as well as board members, staff and many community leaders and arts supporters.

The River's edge Arts Alliance continues to publish a quarterly newsletter and arts calendar and formerly provided the Guide to Culture and Community, its annual program book.  It was estimated in 2010 that more than 23,000 people benefited from the many performances, workshops, concerts, exhibits and other arts events the River's Edge Arts Alliance helped produce.  The River's Edge Arts Alliance offers sponsorship opportunities for organizations and businesses to promote their groups while showing support for the community and the arts.  Memberships, sponsorships and volunteer support enable the River's Edge Arts Alliance to sustain its mission to "enrich lives and create community through the arts.  They also offer advertising in their event programs.

Mission 
The Mission of the River's Edge Arts Alliance is "to enrich lives and create community through the arts".

Programs 
The current programs offered are the River's Edge Chorale, River's Edge Community Band, River's Edge Youth Chorus, River's Edge Players, After School Band Lessons for the students of the Hudson Public Schools, Arts After School and Summer Drama Workshop.

Management and volunteers 
In January 2012, after the retirement of founder Jan Patterson, The River's Edge Arts Alliance Board of Directors hired Lynne Johnson, former Theater Education Director at the Huntington Theatre in Boston, MA, as the executive director.  The River's Edge Arts Alliance is governed by an elected volunteer Board of Directors, run by a staff of one full-time and two part-time staff and consultants and supported by a volunteer staff of over 100 people.  The River's Edge Arts Alliance relies on volunteers to staff events, marketing, operations and theater productions.

References 

River's Edge Arts Alliance Promoting Substance Abuse Prevention Through Project
River's Edge Arts Alliance Receives Coveted Mass Cultural Council Commonwealth Award
Hudson Woman Named New River's Edge Youth Chorus Director
River's Edge Arts Alliance Donates $5,000 To Hudson High School Drama Society For Stage & Technical Improvements
Arts Alliance Art Rocks Along Assabet River Rail Trail
Arts Alliance Founder Jan Patterson Recognized
Business Profile - Lynne Johnson, Executive Director of River's Edge Arts Alliance
Hudson Arts Alliance Exhibit Teaches History In A New Way
Pro Musica Youth Chorus Celebrates 25th Anniversary
River's Edge Community Band Celebrates 10th Anniversary
Retirement Reception for Arts Alliance Founder
Arts Alliance Appoints Hudson Resident New Executive Director

External links 
River's Edge Arts Alliance Website
The Commonwealth Award

1990 establishments in Massachusetts
501(c)(3) organizations
Arts organizations based in Massachusetts
Arts organizations established in 1990
Non-profit organizations based in Massachusetts